The Vietnam national under-23 and Olympic football team represents Vietnam in international football tournaments at the under-22 and under-23 age level.

History

Early years and downfall
The team is considered to be the feeder team for the Vietnam national football team. During the 2005 Southeast Asian Games in the Philippines, a betting and match-fixing scandal involving the team former captain Lê Quốc Vượng shocked the team reputation. The scandal destroyed several of the team players careers, including striker Phạm Văn Quyến and shattered Vietnamese public image towards the youth team to which many of their football fans shied away from the sport with the number of football attendance also decrease dramatically.

Youth redevelopment and revival
In 2007, the Hoàng Anh Gia Lai – Arsenal JMG Academy was established through partnership with Arsenal F.C., JMG Academy and the Vietnamese privately owned Hoàng Anh Gia Lai Corporation to revive the Vietnamese football scenes. Through training of the Vietnamese youth in the academy, this subsequently produced many new talented players which become part of the new generation of the under-23 squad.

AFC U-23 Championship

2016 AFC U-23 Championship

Under Japanese coach Toshiya Miura, Vietnam made their debut in this tournament having qualified from the AFC U-23 qualification in 2016. Positioned in Group I in the qualifiers, Vietnam claimed their first victory over Malaysia by 2–1, though losing to Japan by 0–2 in the next match. The team managed to gain a large victory over Macau by 7–0 in their last group match, and subsequently became the group runners-up. The team then placed in Group D, where they lost 1–3 to Jordan, 0–2 to Australia, and 2–3 to United Arab Emirates.

2018 AFC U-23 Championship and the beginning of the Golden Generation

The team made their second entry in this tournament under South Korean coach Park Hang-seo having qualified from the AFC U-23 qualification in 2018. Drawn again in Group I in the qualifiers, the team started their first match with a 4–0 victory over Timor-Leste before accomplishing a great win of 8–1 over Macau. Although they lost to South Korea by 1–2 in the third group match, Vietnam qualified to the AFC U-23 Championship as the Group I runners-up. The team then placed again in Group D. Although they lost again to South Korea by 1–2, the team bounced back and defeated Australia by 1–0 before drawing 0–0 with Syria. The team became the group runners-up and subsequently became the first Southeast Asian team, alongside Malaysia, who were able to qualify into the quarter finals for the first time in the tournament as well in both teams' history. At the quarter finals, Vietnam managed to lead the match into additional time with a draw score of 3–3 against former champion Iraq, before winning the penalty shoot-out by 5–3, sending the team to semi-finals. The team then met Qatar with the match ending in another draw of 2–2 where they won the match with their second penalty shoot-out of the tournament by 4–3, resulting in the team being the first Southeast Asian football team in history to go to the finals in the competition's history and for the first time ever Vietnam had participated in the final of an AFC competition. At the finals, Vietnam lost to Uzbekistan by 1–2, claiming second place. Despite Vietnam's failure to win the tournament, this was hailed as a historic achievement for Vietnam and the team received national wide welcome after returning from China and subsequently honored by the state for its historic performance.

2020 AFC U-23 Championship

Vietnam tried to run for the race to host the competition, but was eventually beaten by Thailand over the hosting rights. Thus, Vietnam had to take part on the 2020 AFC U-23 Championship qualification where Vietnam was seeded together with Thailand, Indonesia and Brunei, Thailand officially qualified regardless of results. Even though being seeded in a tough group, Vietnam went on to overcome both opponents with over 11 goals scored and conceded none, topping the group with a perfect fashion including the famed 4–0 win over Thailand. In the main stage which served as the qualification for the 2020 Summer Olympics, Vietnam was again seeded into group D where they would once again reunite with Jordan and the United Arab Emirates, alongside North Korea. They had two 0-0 draws over United Arab Emirates and Jordan, before lose to North Korea by 1-2 and being eliminated by finished last place in the group.

Asian Games

2018 Asian Games

In the 2018 Asian Games, Vietnam made another remarkable achievement under the guidance of coach Park as they qualified to the semi-finals for the first time in their history with a clean sheet. Drawn in Group D, the team beat Pakistan by 3–0, Nepal by 2–0, and former champion Japan by 1–0 to lead the group. In the second round, Vietnam then met Bahrain and defeated them by 1–0 before defeating Syria 1–0 in the quarter-finals in a match that went to overtime. At the semi-finals, Vietnam met the defending champion South Korea, led by their 2018 FIFA World Cup players such as pair strikers Son Heung-min, Hwang Hee-chan and their goalkeeper Jo Hyeon-woo, where they failed to continue their path to the finals after losing by 1–3. The team then met United Arab Emirates for the bronze medal match. The score remained 1–1 after extra time, and they ended up losing the penalty shoot-out 3–4.

Southeast Asian Games

2019 Southeast Asian Games

The victory in the 2019 football edition of the Southeast Asian Games is considered as the country first ever SEA Games men's football title since the Vietnamese reunification, having won the first edition of the 1959 Southeast Asian Peninsular Games through South Vietnam. In the 2019 edition, Vietnam opened their campaign in Group B with a large victory over Brunei by 6–0 as well as Laos by 6–1 before defeating Indonesia and Singapore through a slim win by 2–1 and 1–0 respectively. In their last match in the group, Vietnam able to drawn itself by 2–2 against long-time SEA Games men's dominating champion Thailand after being left by two goals in the earlier minutes. After successfully securing themselves in the top group standings, they then meet the rising team of Cambodia in the semi-finals and defeat them with a large win of 4–0 before meeting Indonesia again in the final and defeat them by 3–0 to secure the title after 60 years long-waited.

2021 Southeast Asian Games

Due to the pandemic, the 2021 Seagames hosted by Vietnam, were postponed to 2022. Playing in front of their home fans, Vietnam would successfully defend their Seagames title, as coach Park Hang-seo in his last tournament for the u23/Olympic team, led the nation to their 2nd straight gold medal.
Vietnam began their campaign in the 31st Seagames with a comfortable win over Indonesia 3-0. They failed to breakthrough in the second match, as Vietnam were held to a draw against the Philippines by a score of 0-0. Vietnam would bounce back and win both their last group matches against Myanmar and Timor-Leste to advance to the knockout stage. Vietnam would narrowly defeat Malaysia in a thrilling semi-final match that went to extra time, to advance to the Final. Facing their biggest rivals Thailand, an 83rd minute winner by Nhâm Mạnh Dũng erupted the Mỹ Đình National Stadium in cheers as Vietnam won back to back gold medals in the Seagames football tournament. Vietnam would end their campaign with 0 goals allowed, a SEA Games record, as coach Park Hang-seo exits the Under 23/Olympic team in style.

Kits and sponsors

Kit suppliers

Sponsorship 
Primary sponsors include: Honda, Yanmar, Grand Sport, Sony, Bia Saigon, Acecook, Coca-Cola, Vinamilk, Kao Vietnam, Herbalife Nutrition and TNI Corporation.

Honours
Continental
AFC U-23 Asian Cup:
 Runners-up (1): 2018
Asian Games:
 Fourth place (1): 2018
Regional
AFF U-23 Championship
 Winners (1): 2022
 Third place (1): 2019
Southeast Asian Games 
 Gold medal (2): 2019, 2021
 Silver medal (3): 2003, 2005, 2009
 Bronze medal (1): 2015
Friendly tournaments
VFF Vietnam International Friendly Cup
 Champions (3): 2005, 2009, 2018
Merdeka Cup
 Champions (1): 2008

Competitive records

Olympic Games
Since 1992, football at the Summer Olympics changed into an Under-23 tournament.

AFC U-23 Asian Cup

Asian Games
Since 2002, football at the Asian Games changed into an Under-23 tournament.

SEA Games
Since 2001, football at the Southeast Asian Games changed into an Under-23 tournament.

AFF U-23 Youth Championship

Recent results and fixtures

2021

2022

2023

Players

Current squad 
The following 23 players were called up for the 2023 Doha Cup in Qatar from 23 March to 29 March 2023.

Recent call-ups 
The following players have been called up for the team within the last 12 months and are still available for selection.

 

 

 PRE Preliminary squad
 INJ Player withdrew from the squad due to an injury.
 WD Player withdrew from the squad due to other reason.
 SUS Serving suspension.

Previous squads

 AFF U-23 Championship
 2019 AFF U-22 Youth Championship
 2022 AFF U-23 Championship

Southeast Asian Games
 2005 Southeast Asian Games
 2007 Southeast Asian Games
 2009 Southeast Asian Games
 2011 Southeast Asian Games
 2013 Southeast Asian Games
 2015 Southeast Asian Games
 2017 Southeast Asian Games
 2019 Southeast Asian Games
 2021 Southeast Asian Games

Asian Games
 Football at the 2006 Asian Games squads
 Football at the 2010 Asian Games squads
 Football at the 2014 Asian Games squads
 Football at the 2018 Asian Games squads

AFC U-23 Asian Cup
 2016 AFC U-23 Championship squads
 2018 AFC U-23 Championship squads
 2020 AFC U-23 Championship squads
 2022 AFC U-23 Asian Cup squads

Coaching staff

Coaches 
Coaches by years since 1999
.

Head to head records 
An all-time record table of Vietnam national under-23 football team in major competitions only including; Summer Olympics, AFC U-23 Championship, M-150 Cup, VFF Cup, Merdeka Cup, Southeast Asian Games, AFF U-22 Championship and some other official friendly matches.

See also
 Football in Vietnam
 Vietnam Football Federation
 Vietnam national football team
 Vietnam national under-22 football team
 Vietnam national under-21 football team
 Vietnam national under-20 football team
 Vietnam national under-16 football team
 Vietnam national futsal team
 Vietnam national beach soccer team
 VFF Cup

Notes

References

External links
  

U23
Asian national under-23 association football teams